Day of the Dinosaur is the 128th book in The Hardy Boys series, written by Franklin W. Dixon, published in 1994.

Plot summary
When the Hardy Boys sign on to help prepare for opening day of the new Bayport museum's dinosaur park, the teenage sleuths discover that a deadly, high-tech saboteur is out to put the museum out of business, forever.

References

The Hardy Boys books
1994 American novels
1994 children's books